Motherland Pulse is the debut album by saxophonist Steve Coleman recorded in 1985 and released on JMT Records.

Reception
In his review for AllMusic, Scott Yanow wrote, "The funky yet creative music has less crowded ensembles than Coleman's upcoming records would, and serves as a fine showcase for the talented and strikingly original altoist who contributed six of the eight numbers".

Track listing
All compositions by Steve Coleman except as indicated
 "Irate Blues" (Jean-Paul Bourelly) - 4:23   
 "Another Level" - 5:46   
 "Cüd Ba-Rith" - 5:02   
 "Wights Waits for Weights" - 5:13   
 "No Good Time Fairies" - 5:48   
 "On This" - 5:11   
 "The Glide Was in the Ride" (Geri Allen) - 4:02   
 "Motherland Pulse" - 5:10

Personnel
Steve Coleman – alto saxophone
Geri Allen – piano
Lonnie Plaxico – bass
Mark Johnson (track 5), Marvin "Smitty" Smith (tracks 1–4; 6–8) – drums
Graham Haynes – trumpet (tracks 3 and 5)
Cassandra Wilson – vocals (track 5)

References 

1985 albums
Steve Coleman albums
JMT Records albums
Winter & Winter Records albums